Kim Yong-hee (born 1973) is a South Korean actor.

Filmography

Television series

Film

References

External links 
 
 
 

1973 births
Living people
South Korean male television actors
South Korean male film actors